The 2021 Horizon League men's basketball tournament was the final event of the 2020–21 men's basketball season for the Horizon League. It began on February 25, 2021, and ended on March 9; first-round and quarterfinal games were played at the home courts of the higher seed, with all remaining games at Indiana Farmers Coliseum in Indianapolis. The winner received the conference's automatic berth into the NCAA Tournament.

Seeds
All of the teams participated in the tournament with the top-four teams receiving byes to the quarterfinals. Due to the unbalanced nature of the conference schedule because of COVID-19, teams were seeded by an unpublished formula generated by the league that took into account the following:
 League winning percentage
 Strength of schedule
 Weighting road wins vs. home wins
 Number of league games played

Schedule

Bracket

* denotes overtime period

Game summaries

First round

Quarterfinals

Semifinals

Championship

References

Tournament
Horizon League men's basketball tournament
College sports tournaments in Indiana
Basketball competitions in Indianapolis
Horizon League men's basketball tournament
Horizon League men's basketball tournament
2020s in Indianapolis